Moses Hutzler (November 28, 1800 – January 13, 1889) was a German-born American businessman and co-founder of the first Reform Jewish congregation in the United States, Har Sinai.

Biography
Moses Hutzler was born in Hagenbach, Bavaria, the son of and Beuleh (née Baer) and Gabriel Hutzler. After attending school in Hagenbach, he learned the tailoring and dry-goods business. In 1838, he emigrated to the United States and opened a tailoring shop for women in Baltimore, Maryland which was unsuccessful. He then moved to Frederick, Maryland where he opened a haberdashery business. In 1840, he returned to Baltimore. In 1858, his son Abram G. (1836-1927) opened the company M. Hutzler & Son as Moses signed the note backing the company. After two of his other sons, Charles G. (1840-1907) and David (1843-1915), joined the business, it was redenominated Hutzler Brothers. Hutzler's became the premier department store in Baltimore.

In May 1842, Hutzler founded the Har Sinai Association, an association of reform-minded Jews in Baltimore that formed a community modeled on the Hamburg Temple. The meetings were initially held in Hutzler's house and it was not until 1855 that David Einhorn became the first permanent rabbi.

Personal life
Hutzler married twice. His first wife was Sophie Hutzler; they had two children that lived to adulthood:

In 1829, he married Caroline Neuberger (born 1804), the daughter of Eli B. Neuberger, a merchant. They had five children that lived to adulthood:

He died in Baltimore, Maryland on January 13, 1889.

References

1800 births
1889 deaths
Bavarian emigrants to the United States
People from Baltimore
Hutzler family
19th-century American businesspeople